Karlin may refer to:

Places

Belarus
Karlin (Pinsk), a village

Czech Republic
Karlín, a district of Prague
Karlín (Hodonín District), a municipality and village
Karlín, a village and administrative part of Dolní Poustevna

Poland
Karlin, Łódź Voivodeship, central Poland
Karlin, West Pomeranian Voivodeship, north-west Poland

United States
Karlin, Cleveland
Karlin, Michigan
Karlin, Missouri

Other uses
 Karlin (surname)
 Karlin (Hasidic Dynasty)

See also 

 
 Carline (name)
 Carlin (disambiguation)
 Carling (disambiguation)
 Charlin (disambiguation)
 Charlene (disambiguation)